The 2019 Stanley Cup playoffs was the playoff tournament of the National Hockey League (NHL). The playoffs began on April 10, 2019, after the 2018–19 regular season, and concluded on June 12, 2019, with the St. Louis Blues winning their first Stanley Cup in franchise history defeating the Boston Bruins four games to three in the Stanley Cup Finals.

The Tampa Bay Lightning made the playoffs as the Presidents' Trophy winners with the most points (i.e. best record) during the regular season. The Pittsburgh Penguins increased their post-season appearance streak to thirteen seasons, the current longest streak. The Carolina Hurricanes made the playoffs for the first time since 2009, ending a nine-year playoff drought. For the second season in a row, the Boston Bruins and Toronto Maple Leafs were the only Original Six teams to make the playoffs, marking the fifth time in league history (after 2000, 2001, 2007 and 2018) that only two Original Six teams clinched a playoff berth. For the first time since 2004, both Southern California teams, the Anaheim Ducks and Los Angeles Kings, missed the playoffs. For the second time in League history (and the second season in a row), both the Detroit Red Wings and Montreal Canadiens missed the playoffs.

For the first time in NHL history, all division winners were eliminated in the first round as all the wild-cards advanced to the second round. The Columbus Blue Jackets won a playoff series for the first time, defeating the first-place Lightning in four games, and marking the first time in Stanley Cup playoff history that the Presidents' Trophy winners were swept in the opening round, and the first time since 2012 that the Presidents' Trophy winners were defeated in the opening round. They were soon followed by the Calgary Flames, who with their five-game loss to the Colorado Avalanche, ensured that for the first time in NHL history, neither of the conference number one seeds advanced to the second round. After that, the two remaining division winners, the Nashville Predators and Washington Capitals, were each eliminated in an overtime game, the Predators in six to the Dallas Stars and the Capitals in seven to the Carolina Hurricanes. Also for the first time since 2012, none of the previous year's Conference finalists (the Capitals, the Lightning, the Golden Knights, and the Jets) made it to the second round. For the first time in League history, three series were decided in game seven overtime.

The Blues tied the 1987 Philadelphia Flyers, 2004 Calgary Flames, 2014 Los Angeles Kings, and 2015 Tampa Bay Lightning for playing the most playoff games (26) in a four-round playoff format. The record for most playoff games was subsequently broken by the 2020 Dallas Stars, who played 27 games during the expanded 2020 Stanley Cup playoffs. The Kings were the only other Stanley Cup champions to play 26 games.

Playoff seeds

This was the sixth year in which the top three teams in each division make the playoffs, along with two wild cards in each conference (for a total of eight playoff teams from each conference).

The following teams qualified for the playoffs:

Eastern Conference

Atlantic Division
 Tampa Bay Lightning, Atlantic Division champions, Eastern Conference regular season champions, Presidents' Trophy winners – 128 points
 Boston Bruins – 107 points
 Toronto Maple Leafs – 100 points

Metropolitan Division
 Washington Capitals, Metropolitan Division champions – 104 points
 New York Islanders – 103 points
 Pittsburgh Penguins – 100 points

Wild cards
 Carolina Hurricanes – 99 points
 Columbus Blue Jackets – 98 points

Western Conference

Central Division
 Nashville Predators, Central Division champions – 100 points
 Winnipeg Jets – 99 points (45 )
 St. Louis Blues – 99 points (42 )

Pacific Division
 Calgary Flames, Pacific Division champions, Western Conference regular season champions – 107 points
 San Jose Sharks – 101 points
 Vegas Golden Knights – 93 points

Wild cards
 Dallas Stars – 93 points
 Colorado Avalanche – 90 points

Playoff bracket
In each round, teams competed in a best-of-seven series following a 2–2–1–1–1 format (scores in the bracket indicate the number of games won in each best-of-seven series). The team with home ice advantage played at home for games one and two (and games five and seven, if necessary), and the other team was at home for games three and four (and game six, if necessary). The top three teams in each division made the playoffs, along with two wild cards in each conference, for a total of eight teams from each conference.

In the First Round, the lower seeded wild card in the conference played against the division winner with the best record while the other wild card played against the other division winner, and both wild cards were de facto #4 seeds. The other series matched the second and third place teams from the divisions. In the first two rounds, home ice advantage was awarded to the team with the better seed. Thereafter, it was awarded to the team that had the better regular season record followed by any necessary tie breakers.

Legend
 A1, A2, A3 – The first, second, and third place teams from the Atlantic Division, respectively
 M1, M2, M3 – The first, second, and third place teams from the Metropolitan Division, respectively
 C1, C2, C3 – The first, second, and third place teams from the Central Division, respectively
 P1, P2, P3 – The first, second, and third place teams from the Pacific Division, respectively
 WC – Wild Card teams

First Round

Eastern Conference First Round

(A1) Tampa Bay Lightning vs. (WC2) Columbus Blue Jackets

The Tampa Bay Lightning earned the Presidents' Trophy as the NHL's best regular season team with 128 points. Columbus finished as the Eastern Conference's second wild card, earning 98 points. This was the first playoff meeting between these two teams. Tampa Bay won all three games in this year's regular season series.

The Blue Jackets defeated the Lightning in a four-game sweep. In game one, the Blue Jackets scored four unanswered goals to overcome a three-goal deficit, winning 4–3. Matt Duchene scored a goal and two assists for Columbus in game two, granting the Blue Jackets a 5–1 victory and a 2–0 series lead. During the game Nikita Kucherov hit Markus Nutivaara in the head, prompting NHL Player Safety to suspend the Lightning forward for game three. During said game, Sergei Bobrovsky made 30 saves, giving the Blue Jackets a 3–1 victory and their first 3–0 series lead in franchise history. In game four, the Lightning, desperate for a victory, could not overcome the early two-goal deficit they faced in the first period, allowing Columbus to score three empty-net goals late in the third period and win 7–3, sweeping Tampa Bay 4–0 and earning their first playoff series victory in franchise history. The Lightning became the first Presidents' Trophy winners to be swept in the opening round.

(A2) Boston Bruins vs. (A3) Toronto Maple Leafs
The Boston Bruins finished second in the Atlantic Division, earning 107 points. The Toronto Maple Leafs earned 100 points to finish third in the Atlantic Division. This was the sixteenth playoff meeting overall, and second consecutive, between these two teams, with Toronto winning eight of the fifteen previous series. They last met in the previous year's Eastern Conference First Round, which Boston won in seven games. Boston won three of the four games in this year's regular season series.

The Bruins defeated the Maple Leafs in seven games. Mitch Marner scored twice in Toronto's game one victory, the final score of which was 4–1. Game two saw controversy in officiating, with Bruins players becoming more physical, to the point where Boston forward Jake DeBrusk collided with Toronto forward Nazem Kadri, who was skating hard out of the penalty box, resulting in a knee-on-knee collision, injuring the Maple Leafs forward. No penalty was called on the play. Kadri would return to the game, but retaliated against DeBrusk, cross-checking the forward in the head, resulting in a major penalty for the Toronto forward. Kadri was suspended for the remainder of the series. The Bruins ended the game 4–1. In game three, Auston Matthews and Andreas Johnsson scored a goal and notched an assist, leading the Maple Leafs to a 3–2 victory. In game four, the Bruins held on for a 6–4 victory, keeping the Maple Leafs from tying in the closing minutes after leading by three goals in the third period. The Maple Leafs scored twice in the third period of game five and held onto a one-goal lead late in the game to give Toronto a 2–1 victory and a 3–2 series lead. In game six, Brad Marchand had two goals and an assist in a 4–2 Bruins victory to push the series to a seventh game. In the seventh game, Boston goalie Tuukka Rask made 32 saves to defeat the Maple Leafs 5–1 and advance to the second round.

(M1) Washington Capitals vs. (WC1) Carolina Hurricanes
The Washington Capitals finished first in the Metropolitan Division earning 104 points. Carolina finished as the Eastern Conference's first wild card earning 99 points. This was the first playoff meeting between these two teams. Washington won all four games in this year's regular season series.

The Hurricanes defeated the Capitals in seven games. In game one, Nicklas Backstrom scored twice and teammate John Carlson had three assists in Washington's 4–2 victory. During a tight back-and-forth game two, Brooks Orpik scored the overtime winner for the Capitals, giving Washington a 4–3 victory. In game three, Carolina forward Warren Foegele scored twice and assisted once as the Hurricanes limited the Capitals to 18 shots in a 5–0 blowout victory. During the game rookie Andrei Svechnikov was challenged by Alexander Ovechkin to a fight during which the young Hurricane forward was knocked out and removed from the game due to concussion protocol. The Capitals increased their shot count in game four, but Hurricanes goalie Petr Mrazek stopped 30 of those 31 shots, evening the series in a 2–1 victory. In game five, the Capitals blew out the Hurricanes 6–0 with Backstrom scoring two goals and adding two assists, as goaltender Braden Holtby stopped all 30 shots he faced. Carolina broke the tie in game six as they scored three goals in the third period to force a seventh game. The Hurricanes rallied from two separate two goal deficits to tie game seven forcing overtime. In double overtime, Carolina forward Brock McGinn ended the third longest game seven in NHL history at 11:05 by tipping in Justin Williams' shot to send the Hurricanes to the second round of the playoffs for the first time since 2009; with the victory Carolina has won five consecutive game sevens dating back to 2006.

(M2) New York Islanders vs. (M3) Pittsburgh Penguins
The New York Islanders finished second in the Metropolitan Division with 103 points. The Pittsburgh Penguins earned 100 points to finish third in the Metropolitan Division. This was the fifth playoff meeting between these two teams with New York winning three of the four previous series. They last met in the 2013 Eastern Conference Quarterfinals, which Pittsburgh won in six games. These teams split their four-game regular season series. This was the first time since the 1988 Patrick Division Semifinals that the Islanders had home-ice advantage in a playoff series.

The Islanders defeated the Penguins in a four-game sweep. This was the first Islanders sweep since 1983. In game one, New York goalie Robin Lehner made 41 saves and Josh Bailey scored 4:39 into overtime to give the Islanders a 4–3 victory. Jordan Eberle had a goal and an assist in game two, leading the Islanders to a 3–1 victory. In game three, Lehner stopped 25 of 26 shots helping the Islanders win 4–1. Game four was a tight-checking, defensive affair as the Islanders kept a one-goal lead over the Penguins for two periods until an empty-net goal by Bailey sealed the victory for New York defeating Pittsburgh 3–1 and advancing to the second round in a 4–0 sweep.

Western Conference First Round

(C1) Nashville Predators vs. (WC1) Dallas Stars
The Nashville Predators finished first in the Central Division earning 100 points. Dallas finished as the Western Conference's first wild card earning 93 points. This was the first playoff meeting between these two teams. Nashville won three of the five games in this year's regular season series.

The Stars defeated the Predators in six games. Dallas rookie Miro Heiskanen scored a goal and an assist to help the Stars achieve a 3–2 victory in game one. In game two, both teams played defensively forcing an overtime period in which Nashville forward Craig Smith scored to give the Predators a 2–1 victory. Pekka Rinne stopped 40 shots in game three, ensuring a 3–2 Predators win. In another goalie performance for game four, Dallas' own Ben Bishop made 34 saves shutting down the Predators in a 5–1 victory. In game five, Alexander Radulov scored twice with captain Jamie Benn assisting thrice for the Stars taking the series lead in a 5–3 victory. During a defensive game six, both teams fired more than 35 shots apiece in regulation time with each team scoring once. In the resulting overtime period John Klingberg put away the series-winning goal at 17:02 for Dallas, winning the series 4–2 and the game 2–1.

(C2) Winnipeg Jets vs. (C3) St. Louis Blues
The Winnipeg Jets finished second in the Central Division, earning 99 points. The St. Louis Blues also earned 99 points, but they finished third in the Central Division as Winnipeg won the first tie-breaker of combined regulation and overtime wins. This was the first playoff meeting between these two teams. This was also the first playoff meeting between the two cities since 1982. Winnipeg won three of the four games in this year's regular season series.

The Blues defeated the Jets in six games. For the first time since the 2004 Western Conference Final, the away team won the first five games in the series. In game one, rookie goaltender Jordan Binnington made 24 saves to give St. Louis a 2–1 victory. Oskar Sundqvist scored twice for the Blues in game two taking the triumph 4–3. In game three, Winnipeg forward Kyle Connor scored twice in a 6–3 victory. Game four remained scoreless until the third period in which both teams notched a goal; however, in overtime Connor scored the winning-goal for the Jets tying the series 2–2 in a 2–1 affair. His goal also Winnipeg's first playoff overtime goal in franchise history. Winnipeg took a two-goal lead in game five, but St. Louis tied the game in the third period and with 15 seconds left, Jaden Schwartz scored to give St. Louis a 3–2 victory. Schwartz scored a natural hat trick in game six as the Blues hung on to a 3–2 series clinching victory.

(P1) Calgary Flames vs. (WC2) Colorado Avalanche
The Calgary Flames finished first in the Pacific Division earning 107 points. The Colorado Avalanche earned 90 points to finish as the Western Conference's second wild card. This was the first playoff meeting between these two teams. Calgary won all three games in this year's regular season series.

The Avalanche defeated the Flames in five games. In game one, goalie Mike Smith stopped all 26 shots he faced and assisted on one of Calgary's four goals in the Flames 4–0 victory. Game two necessitated overtime, and Nathan MacKinnon scored to give the Avalanche a 3–2 victory. The Avalanche scored six goals in game three, one of which included the first goal of Cale Makar in his NHL debut; Colorado won the game 6–2. In game four, Colorado came back from a two-goal deficit to force overtime and Mikko Rantanen scored his second of the night to give the Avalanche a 3–2 victory and a 3–1 series lead. Game five saw Colin Wilson and Rantanen both score twice, giving Colorado a 5–1 victory and advancing to the second round for the first time since 2008.

(P2) San Jose Sharks vs. (P3) Vegas Golden Knights
The San Jose Sharks finished second in the Pacific Division earning 101 points. The Vegas Golden Knights earned 93 points to finish third in Pacific Division. This was the second playoff meeting between these teams. They last met in the previous year's Western Conference Second Round which Vegas won in six games. These teams split their four-game regular season series.

The Sharks came back from a 3–1 series deficit to defeat the Golden Knights in seven games. Four Sharks players scored a goal and assisted on another goal in game one, giving San Jose a 5–2 victory. In game two, after a wild first period in which Vegas took a three-goal lead only for San Jose to tie before the period ended, Mark Stone's power-play goal in the second period would be the game-winner for the Golden Knights, defeating the Sharks 5–3. Stone continued his scoring into game three, adding a hat trick into Vegas' 6–3 victory. In game four, Max Pacioretty had two goals and two assists while goaltender Marc-Andre Fleury stopped all 28 shots granting Vegas a 5–0 victory and a 3–1 series lead. The Sharks avoided elimination in game five, outscoring the Golden Knights 5–2 to force a sixth game. In game six, the Sharks evened the series with a double-overtime short-handed goal by Tomas Hertl, backstopped by Martin Jones who made 58 saves in a 2–1 victory. In the seventh game, after taking a three-goal lead, in the third period, Vegas' Cody Eakin was assessed a controversial major penalty and game misconduct as a result of a play that injured Sharks forward Joe Pavelski. The Sharks took the lead 4–3 after scoring four unanswered goals on the ensuing five-minute power play (Kevin Labanc assisted on the first three goals, two Logan Couture tallies sandwiching Hertl tipping in an Erik Karlsson shot, before scoring the fourth goal). However, the Golden Knights tied the game with 47 seconds left in regulation, sending the game into overtime. At 18:19 of the first overtime, Barclay Goodrow scored the series-winning goal for the Sharks, coming back from a 3–1 series deficit and defeating the Golden Knights 5–4. The NHL later apologized to the Golden Knights for the call on Eakin, and the two referees working the game were suspended for the remainder of the playoffs. The Sharks became just the second team in NHL history, along with the 2013 Boston Bruins, to overcome a three-goal deficit in the third period of a seventh game.

Second Round

Eastern Conference Second Round

(A2) Boston Bruins vs. (WC2) Columbus Blue Jackets
This was the first playoff meeting between these two teams. Boston won two of the three games in this year's regular season series.

The Bruins defeated the Blue Jackets in six games. In game one, Charlie Coyle scored his second goal of the game in the first overtime at 5:15 to give the Bruins a 3–2 victory. Game two required overtime again with both teams tied 2–2 in regulation, and in double-overtime Matt Duchene scored on the power-play at 3:42 to give Columbus the victory. Sergei Bobrovsky made 36 saves in game three backstopping the Blue Jackets to a 2–1 victory. In game four, Patrice Bergeron scored twice and goaltender Tuukka Rask made 39 saves to edge Columbus 4–1 and tie the series 2–2. The Bruins held off the Blue Jackets two-goal rally in game five with David Pastrnak scoring with 1:28 left in the third period to give Boston a 4–3 victory and a 3–2 series lead. In game six, Rask shut the door on the Blue Jackets, stopping all 39 shots he faced in a 3–0 victory and winning the series 4–2.

(M2) New York Islanders vs. (WC1) Carolina Hurricanes
This was the first playoff meeting between these two teams. New York won three of the four games in this year's regular season series.

The Hurricanes defeated the Islanders in a four-game sweep. In game one, Islanders goaltender Robin Lehner and Hurricanes goaltender Petr Mrazek stayed stout in regulation with Lehner stopping 29 shots and Mrazek stopping 30. During the ensuing overtime, Jordan Staal scored to give Carolina 1–0 victory. In game two, Warren Foegele and Nino Niederreiter scored 48 seconds apart in the third period to take the lead 2–1 giving Carolina the victory. In the second period of game two, Petr Mrazek was injured, leading to Curtis McElhinney replacing him in net for the remainder of the series; as a result McElhinney, at 35 years old, became the oldest goaltender in NHL history to make his first career playoff start in game three. Teuvo Teravainen scored twice in game three to give the Hurricanes a 5–2 victory and a 3–0 series lead. Teravainen continued his scoring into game four, notching a goal and an assist in Carolina's 5–2 victory. This was the Hurricanes' first four-game series sweep in franchise history and the franchise's first sweep since the Hartford Whalers swept the Quebec Nordiques in three games during the 1986 Adams Division Semifinals. In addition, the Islanders were swept in a playoff series for the first time since the 1994 Eastern Conference Quarterfinals against the New York Rangers. This was the first time since the 1993 Buffalo Sabres that a team who swept a first round playoff series got swept in the second round. Game two was the last Stanley Cup playoffs game to be held at Barclays Center.

Western Conference Second Round

(C3) St. Louis Blues vs. (WC1) Dallas Stars
This was the fourteenth playoff meeting between these two teams with St. Louis winning seven of the thirteen previous series. They last met in the 2016 Western Conference Second Round, which St. Louis won in seven games. Dallas won three of the four games in this year's regular season series.

The Blues defeated the Stars in seven games. Vladimir Tarasenko scored twice for the Blues in game one, holding the Stars to a close 3–2 victory. In game two, the Stars bounced back with rookie Roope Hintz scoring two goals and adding an assist in a 4–2 win. With 1:38 left in the third period of game three, Patrick Maroon put the Blues ahead 4–3 holding on the lead for the victory. Ben Bishop held the fort for the Stars, making 27 saves in game four for a 4–2 triumph. Bishop continued his goal-tending prowess into game five, stopping 38 shots for the Stars in a 2–1 victory. The Blues scored 33 seconds apart in the third period of game six to force a seventh game winning 4–1. In game seven, although Stars goaltender Ben Bishop made a valiant effort stopping 52 shots, Patrick Maroon's goal at 5:50 of double-overtime sent the Blues to the Western Conference Final defeating Dallas 2–1.

(P2) San Jose Sharks vs. (WC2) Colorado Avalanche
This was the fifth playoff meeting between these two teams with both teams splitting the four previous series. They last met in the 2010 Western Conference Quarterfinals which San Jose won in six games. San Jose won all three games in this year's regular season series.

The Sharks defeated the Avalanche in seven games. In game one, Brent Burns had a goal and three assists in the Sharks' convincing 5–2 victory. Tyson Barrie scored a goal and assisted on two more in game two, giving the Avalanche a 4–3 win. In game three, Sharks forward Logan Couture scored his first playoff hat trick en route to a 4–2 victory. The Avalanche shut out the Sharks 3–0 in game four as goaltender Philipp Grubauer stopped all 32 shots he faced. In game five, the Sharks put up 39 shots against the Avalanche with two goals coming from forward Tomas Hertl in a 2–1 victory. J. T. Compher scored twice and Gabriel Landeskog scored at 2:32 of the first overtime to force a seventh game defeating the Sharks 4–3. In game seven, Burns had two assists, including one on Joonas Donskoi's series-winning goal, that helped the Sharks win 3–2 and advance to the Conference Finals.

Conference Finals

Eastern Conference Final

(A2) Boston Bruins vs. (WC1) Carolina Hurricanes
This was the fifth playoff meeting between these two teams with Boston winning three of the four previous series. They last met in the 2009 Eastern Conference Semifinals which Carolina won in seven games. This was Boston's eighth appearance in the Conference Finals. They last went to the Conference Finals in 2013, which they won against the Pittsburgh Penguins in a four-game sweep. This was Carolina's fourth Conference Finals appearance. They last went to the Conference Finals in 2009; they lost in a four-game sweep to Pittsburgh. Boston won two of the three games in this year's regular season series.

The Bruins defeated the Hurricanes in a four-game sweep. In game one, the Bruins scored two power-play goals 28 seconds apart in the third period to win 5–2. Charlie Coyle and Torey Krug both had three assists in the Bruins 6–2 victory in game two. In game three, Bruins goalie Tuukka Rask made 35 saves in Boston's close 2–1 victory, taking a 3–0 series lead. Patrice Bergeron scored twice and notched an assist, David Pastrnak had a goal and two assists, and Rask stopped all 24 shots he faced in the Bruins 4–0 game four victory, sending the Bruins to the Stanley Cup Finals.

Western Conference Final

(P2) San Jose Sharks vs. (C3) St. Louis Blues
This was the sixth playoff meeting between these two teams with San Jose winning three of the five previous series. This was St. Louis' fourth Conference Finals appearance and San Jose's fifth appearance in the Conference Finals. This also marked the thirteenth conference final in the last sixteen seasons that included a California-based team. The teams' last appearance in the Conference Finals was against each other in 2016, which San Jose won in six games. San Jose won two of the three games in this year's regular season series.

The Blues defeated the Sharks in six games. In game one, Logan Couture and Timo Meier both scored twice in the Sharks' 6–3 victory. Although Couture scored twice in game two, the Blues edged the Sharks 4–2. In game three, controversy struck in overtime as Meier swatted at the puck with his glove towards Erik Karlsson who scored in overtime. The NHL later admitted the refs missed the hand pass Meier committed. The Blues were undeterred by this blatant non-call as goalie Jordan Binnington made 29 saves in game four en route to a 2–1 victory. In game five, Jaden Schwartz scored a hat trick and Binnington stopped all 21 shots he faced for the Blues in a 5–0 victory. The Blues shut down the Sharks in game six, scoring five goals in a 5–1 victory and advancing to the Stanley Cup Finals and ending its 49-year appearance drought. With the Blues advancing to the Finals only five active franchises have never won their conference since the playoffs went to a conference based format in 1982 (Arizona, Columbus, Minnesota, Toronto and Winnipeg).

Stanley Cup Finals

This was the third playoff meeting between these two teams, with Boston winning both previous series. They last met in the 1972 Stanley Cup Semifinals which Boston won in a four-game sweep. St. Louis made their fourth appearance in the Finals. They last advanced to the Finals in 1970, which they lost in four games to the Boston Bruins. Boston made their twentieth Finals appearance. They last advanced to the Finals in 2013, which they lost in six games to the Chicago Blackhawks. These teams split the two games in this year's regular season series.

Player statistics

Skaters
These are the top ten skaters based on points.

Goaltenders
St.louis Blues Goaltender Jordan Binnington set an NHL record for rookie goaltenders with 16 wins, beating the previous record held by Patrick Roy. This is a combined table of the top five goaltenders based on goals against average and the top five goaltenders based on save percentage, with at least 420 minutes played. The table is sorted by GAA, and the criteria for inclusion are bolded.

Television
This was the eighth postseason under NBC Sports' current 10-year contract for American television rights to the NHL. All national coverage of games are being aired on either NBCSN, the NBC broadcast network, NHL Network, USA Network, or CNBC. During the first round, excluding games exclusively broadcast on NBC, the regional rights holders of each participating U.S. team will produce local telecasts of their respective games. For the third year, the first round national broadcasts were not blacked out on television in the markets of participating teams, and could co-exist with the local broadcasts (however, NBC-provided coverage was restricted in Pittsburgh and Las Vegas, where AT&T SportsNet held the regional rights to the Penguins and the Golden Knights respectively).

In Canada, for the fifth postseason under Rogers Media's current 12-year contract, coverage was broadcast in English by Sportsnet and CBC under the Hockey Night in Canada brand, and streamed on Sportsnet Now, CBCSports.ca (for games televised by CBC), or the subscription service Rogers NHL Live.

In French, all games were aired by TVA Sports. Availability of the games were initially hampered by a major carriage dispute between Bell Satellite TV and the channel's owner, Quebecor Media, over a proposed increase in carriage fees which Bell considered poorly-justified. On April 10, 2019, Quebecor pulled TVA Sports from Bell Satellite TV, despite it being illegal in Canada for channels to be pulled by their owners at a "standstill" in carriage negotiations. Bell publicly condemned the action, and stated it would offer the Sportsnet networks as a free preview to affected subscribers for the duration of the dispute, so that viewers still have access to the English-language broadcasts. On April 12, 2019, the channels were restored per a court injunction granted to Bell. The CRTC has since warned that any attempt to pull the channel again would result in a suspension of its license until access is restored.

In the United States, NBC reported that the first round saw its highest cable viewership since 1994 and the highest overall ratings since 2012. Game seven of the Capitals/Hurricanes series was the most-watched first round game on cable since 2000.

References

External links
Stanley Cup playoffs

Stanley Cup playoffs
play